Alexander La Milliere (b Dublin 9 July 1723 - 7 September 1800) was Archdeacon of Cork  from 1796 until his death.

He was the incumbent at Curraghconway and  Chancellor of Cork Cathedral from 1774 until 1782.

References

Alumni of Trinity College Dublin
Archdeacons of Cork
Politicians from Dublin (city)
18th-century Irish Anglican priests
1723 births
1800 deaths
Irish people of French descent